Swe is a Burmese name that may refer to
Ba Swe (1915–1987), second Premier of Burma
Chit Swe, Burmese Minister for Agriculture and Forestry
Hla Myint Swe (minister), Minister of Transport in Myanmar 
Hla Thein Swe, Burmese military officer
Khin Maung Swe, Burmese politician 
Kyaw Swe (actor) (1924–1982), Burmese actor and film director 
Kyaw Swe (minister), Minister of Home Affairs of Myanmar (Burma) 
Kyaw Swe (politician), Burmese politician currently serving as a House of Nationalities MP
Kyaw Tint Swe (born 1945), Burmese politician 
Min Swe, Burmese politician 
Mingyi Swe (c. 1490s–1549), viceroy of Toungoo in Burma
Myint Swe (disambiguation), multiple people
Naing Win Swe (1940–1995), Burmese writer and poet
Nan Nyunt Swe (1923–2010), Burmese writer 
Swe Li Myint (born 1993), Burmese middle-distance runner 
Swe Swe Win (born 1975), Burmese weightlifter
Swe Zin Htaik (born 1953), Burmese actress
Thein Swe, Burmese politician 
Hla Swe (politician), (born 1960), Member of Parliament at the House of Nationalities
Tint Swe (disambiguation), multiple people

Burmese names